James Rolle (born February 2, 1964) is an American former sprinter.

References

1964 births
Living people
American male sprinters
Place of birth missing (living people)
Pan American Games gold medalists for the United States
Athletes (track and field) at the 1983 Pan American Games
Pan American Games medalists in athletics (track and field)
Medalists at the 1983 Pan American Games